Musalu (also Romanized as Mūsálū and Mūsá Lū) is a village in Bedevostan-e Sharqi Rural District, in the Central District of Heris County, East Azerbaijan Province, Iran. At the 2006 census, its population was 145, in 43 families.

References 

Populated places in Heris County